The North West Community Development Council is one of five Community Development Councils (CDCs) set up across the Republic of Singapore to aid in local administration of governmental policies and schemes. They are funded in part by the government although they are free to engage in fund-raising activities.

Constituencies
As of March 2020, the North West district covers:

Single Member Constituency (SMC)
Bukit Panjang SMC

Group Representation Constituency (GRC)
Holland-Bukit Timah GRC
Bukit Timah
Cashew
Ulu Pandan
Zhenghua
Marsiling-Yew Tee GRC
Limbang
Marsiling
Woodgrove
Yew Tee
Nee Soon GRC
Chong Pang
Nee Soon Central
Nee Soon East
Nee Soon South
Nee Soon Link
Sembawang GRC
Admiralty
Canberra
Sembawang Central
Sembawang West
Woodlands

Mayors 
The incumbent Mayor of North West District is Alex Yam of Marsiling–Yew Tee GRC since 2020.

References

External links
North West Community Development Council

Districts of Singapore
2001 establishments in Singapore
Organizations established in 2001